Arthur Owen may refer to:

 Arthur Owen (racing driver) (1915–2002), British racing driver
 Arthur Owen (MP) (c. 1608–1678), Welsh politician
 Sir Arthur Owen, 3rd Baronet (c. 1674–1753), Welsh politician

See also
 Owen Arthur (born 1949), Barbadian politician